The Council for Scientific and Industrial Research (CSIR) is South Africa's central and premier scientific research and development organisation. It was established by an act of parliament in 1945 and is situated on its own campus in the city of Pretoria. It is the largest research and development (R&D) organisation in Africa and accounts for about 10% of the entire African R&D budget. It has a staff of approximately 3,000 technical and scientific researchers, often working in multi-disciplinary teams.

CSIR contract research and development

Overview
The CSIR contract R&D portfolio aims to enable clear understanding of national imperatives and the needs of industry to optimise the impact of the CSIR's R&D outputs. It leverages public, private and international partnerships in support of cutting-edge science, engineering and technology (SET).The organisation has clients in both the private sector (micro, small, medium and large enterprises; formal and informal), as well as in the public sector (national, provincial and local government). The organisation also deals with public enterprises and institutions, national safety and security establishments, and development structures. Regionally and abroad, the CSIR fosters partnerships and a network of clients and partner organisations as part of a global sphere of influence on matters of technology. The CSIR liaises closely with tertiary education institutions. With a strong emphasis on relevant and developmental work, it also has strong roots in various communities, and collaborates with a wide range of donors and funding agencies. The CSIR aims to contribute to the national programme of development, perform relevant knowledge generating research and transferring technology and skilled human capital, and strengthen the science and technology base. The Frascati Manual defines R&D as creative work undertaken systematically to increase the stock of knowledge, including knowledge of humanity, culture and society, and the use of this knowledge to devise new applications. At the CSIR, the research, development and innovation (RDI) chain encompasses, what we term, types A, B and C research: 
Type A refers to directed basic or applied research that explores the underlying nature of a system 
Type B talks to experimental development that typically results in a new prototype, which captures new knowledge into a product, service or policy 
Type C is technology transfer, the first step of knowledge application. 
The CSIR operates with two kinds of R&D income, each with its own purpose. The Parliamentary Grant is used for strengthening the CSIR's S&T base - knowledge, people and infrastructure. Secondly, Contract R&D income is derived from performing contract research for clients in the public and private sectors, locally and abroad, on specific programmes, initiatives and projects. All R&D work contributes to the National System of Innovation (NSI).

Presidents and Chief Executive Officers

Research areas

The CSIR's main areas of research
Built Environment
Biosciences
Defence, Peace, Safety and Security
Information and Communications
Laser Technology
Materials Science and Manufacturing
Natural Resources and the Environment
Mining Innovation
Modelling and Digital Science
Mobile Intelligence Autonomous Systems
Nanotechnology
Synthetic Biology
Remote Sensing

SERA

In 1999 a strategic alliance was formed between the University of Pretoria and the Council for Scientific and Industrial Research. This alliance, which is known as the Southern Education and Research Alliance (SERA), collaborates locally and internationally with universities, NGO's, companies and multinational bodies in various research areas.

Aircraft
CSIR Experimental Autogyro II

Controversy
In July 2016 the amaBhungane Centre for Investigative Journalism published an article that alleges that South Africa's Science and Technology Minister Naledi Pandor and Director-General Phil Mjwara were attempting to put undue pressure the CSIR, at the behest of The corrupt ANC treasurer-general Zweli Mkhize, to favour the Chinese multinational Huawei Technologies in the purchase of a new R116-million (equivalent to around US$8 million) super computer for the institute.  This followed the publication of the council's long time CEO, Sibusiso Sibisi's, open letter of resignation stating that irregularities and political pressure on the awarding of contracts to suppliers was of great concern.

In a well-known case of biopiracy, bioprospectors from  South Africa's Council for Scientific and Industrial Research realized that Hoodia was marketable (after a marketing campaign falsely claiming that it was an appetite suppressant for weight loss) and patented its use as an appetite suppressant without recognizing the San people's traditional claims to the knowledge of the plant and its uses. The patent was later sold to Unilever, which marketed hoodia products as diet supplements. In 2003, the South African San Council made an agreement with CSIR in which they would receive from 6 to 8% of the revenue from the sale of Ho. gordonii products, money which would be deposited in a fund to purchase land for the San people who had been dispossessed from their lands by migrating tribes.

References

External links

CSIR Website
CSIR Research Space -  provides access to some of the research outputs generated by CSIR scientists
Defence Research and Development in South Africa - The Role of the CSIR by Paul Cilliers
Meraka Institute - The African Advanced Institute for Information and Communication Technology 
SEDS South Africa (Students for the Exploration and Development of Space, South Africa)
Human Factors and Enterprise Engineering - research group at Meraka Institute 
Transport research in the CSIR: 
Optronic Sensor Systems
Centre for Mining Innovation

Science and technology think tanks
Government of South Africa
Research institutes in South Africa
Think tanks based in South Africa
Organisations based in Pretoria